Orthodoxy by country may refer to:

 Eastern Orthodoxy by country
 Oriental Orthodoxy by country